Alternative Livelihood Programs are the name given to government attempts, especially in South America to replace the illicit cultivation of banned substances, such as opium or coca, with alternative, legal crops or other activities as a source of income.

Alternative Livelihood has sometimes been referred as Alternative Development.

References

External links
 A case study of alternative livelihood in Laos by UNODC (PDF)
 Alternative Development Cooperation in East Asia by UNODC
 Alternative Livelihoods Program in Northeastern Afghanistan - a project of CIDA implemented by Aga Khan Foundation Canada
 Integrated Alternative Livelihoods Program in Kandahar Province - a project of CIDA
 Research in Alternative Livelihoods Fund (RALF) - administered by the U.K.'s Department for International Development (DFID)
 Afghanistan Alternative Livelihoods Program - implemented by PADCO, a member of the International Peace Operations Association

Drug control law
International development